The following lists events that happened during 1896 in Chile.

Incumbents
President of Chile: Jorge Montt (until 18 September), Federico Errázuriz Echaurren

Events

June
25 June - Chilean presidential election, 1896

Births
8 January - Luciano Kulczewski (d. 1972)
19 May - Jorge Alessandri (d. 1986)
24 September - Camilo Mori (d. 1973)

References 

 
Years of the 19th century in Chile
Chile